Ronald Frank Anderson (born November 15, 1948) is a Canadian retired professional ice hockey defenceman who played 115 games in the World Hockey Association for the Chicago Cougars and Cleveland Crusaders.

References

External links

1948 births
Canadian ice hockey defencemen
Chicago Cougars players
Cleveland Crusaders players
Greensboro Generals (EHL) players
Ice hockey people from Ontario
Jacksonville Barons players
Living people
People from Dryden, Ontario
Tidewater Sharks players
Southern Hockey League (1973–1977) coaches
Winston-Salem Polar Twins (SHL) players